Eldritch Wizardry is a supplementary rulebook by Gary Gygax and Brian Blume, written for the original edition of the Dungeons & Dragons (D&D) fantasy role-playing game, which included a number of significant additions to the core game. Its product designation is TSR 2005.

Contents
Eldritch Wizardry introduced psionics and the druid character class. The 60-page supplement added several other new concepts to the D&D game, including demons (and their lords Orcus and Demogorgon), psionics-using monsters (such as mind flayers), and artifacts (including the Rod of Seven Parts and the Axe of the Dwarvish Lords).

Any human of any alignment or any character class, except monks and druids, may have a chance to have psionic ability. Each of the character classes has its own list of psionic abilities which it may gain, and the book offers psionic attack and defense modes of various types. The druid, first introduced in the Greyhawk supplement as a monster, is expanded in Eldritch Wizardry as a clerical sub-class, a priest of a neutral-type nature worship. The book introduces seven distinct types of demons, as well as creatures that have psionic attack capabilities and/or astral or ethereal creatures, such as brain moles, thought eaters, su-monsters, and intellect devourers. Eldritch Wizardry includes a modified combat system which takes into account a player's armor type, readiness of weapons, encumbrance, level of spell being used, and more. The over twenty artifacts and relics included have tremendous powers unknown to the players, who must rely on rumor or trial and error. The book adds new wilderness encounter charts encompassing the new monsters and character classes introduced in the previous supplements and in several issues of The Strategic Review.

Publication history
Eldritch Wizardry was written by Gary Gygax and Brian Blume and published by TSR in 1976 as a sixty-page digest-sized book, and was the third supplement to the original D&D rules. The supplement was part of the continued expansion of D&D in 1976, which also included Gods, Demi-Gods & Heroes and Swords & Spells.

It bears the designation Supplement III, following the Greyhawk and Blackmoor supplements, which were released the previous year, and its product number was TSR 2005.  Illustrations were provided by David C. Sutherland III, Tracy Lesch, and Gary Kwapisz, with a cover by Deborah Larson. The booklet was edited by Tim Kask.

John Eric Holmes' 1977 Dungeons & Dragons Basic Set was a revision of the original Dungeons & Dragons plus the Greyhawk, Blackmoor, and Eldritch Wizardry supplements. Some of the anti-D&D moral panic had started with the 1976 publication of Eldritch Wizardry.

The Eldritch Wizardry supplement was reproduced as a premium reprint on November 19, 2013, as part of a deluxe, premium reprint of the original "White Box" which featured new packaging in an oaken box. Each booklet featured new cover art but was otherwise a faithful reproduction of the original, including original interior art.

Reception
Glen Taylor reviewed Eldritch Wizardry in The Space Gamer No. 7. He felt that, like the Greyhawk and Blackmoor supplements before it, Eldritch Wizardry introduces new material to the basic D&D game system "for a more intricate, complex playing experience. Like the other supplements, the new material in EW is organized around the original format for easy absorption into the basic structure of the game." He notes psionic abilities as the first major addition in the book: "The list of psionic abilities is long and varied, and most of them are very useful." He felt that some players may find the modified combat system "too cumbersome, but I find them much more logical than simply rolling a die to see which side gets to strike first". He felt that the section on artifacts was "designed to put some of the mystery and danger back into D&D.  I feel they have succeeded admirably." He felt that the wilderness tables were "an element sorely-needed" and "produce the very desirable effect of having some types of monsters substantially more common than others, and since this is achieved by duplication of types on the same table, players can freely alter anything with which they don't agree, as well as insert their own fiendish monster types into the charts". Taylor called the physical quality of Eldritch Wizardry "excellent" and the artwork "superb", and felt that the book was "well worth the admittedly high price", concluding that it is "as good as Greyhawk, and that's saying a lot. It should put the spice of danger and unpredictability back into D&D, and partially satiate that hunger for new material that typifies D&D enthusiasts everywhere."

RPGnet reviewed the book in 2001 as vintage nostalgia rating it with a 4 for style ("Classy and well done"), and a 4 for substance ("Meaty"), and saying "From the depths of RPG history, it's one of the books that started it all."

References

External links
http://www.rpg.net/news+reviews/reviews/rev_4232.html

1976 books
Dungeons & Dragons sourcebooks
Role-playing game supplements introduced in 1976